Opsiclines is a genus of moths of the family Yponomeutidae.

Species
Opsiclines leucomorpha - Lower, 1900 

Yponomeutidae